The following is a list of the 21 cantons of the Oise department, in France, following the French canton reorganisation which came into effect in March 2015:

 Beauvais-1
 Beauvais-2
 Chantilly
 Chaumont-en-Vexin
 Clermont
 Compiègne-1
 Compiègne-2
 Creil
 Crépy-en-Valois
 Estrées-Saint-Denis
 Grandvilliers
 Méru
 Montataire
 Mouy
 Nanteuil-le-Haudouin
 Nogent-sur-Oise
 Noyon
 Pont-Sainte-Maxence
 Saint-Just-en-Chaussée
 Senlis
 Thourotte

References